The 15th Golden Raspberry Awards were held on March 26, 1995, at the El Rey Hotel in Los Angeles, California, to recognize the worst the movie industry had to offer in 1994. Erotic thriller Color of Night became the first (and so far only) Golden Raspberry Worst Picture "winner" to not receive a single other Razzie (out of eight other nominations). Thumbelina became the first animated film to be nominated for and win a Razzie, which it received for Worst Original Song. The Specialist, Wyatt Earp, The Flintstones and Naked Gun : The Final Insult each took home two awards, even though the latter two were not nominated for Worst Picture.

Awards and nominations

Films with multiple nominations 
These films received multiple nominations:

Criticism 
In later years, the nomination for Jim Carrey in the Worst New Star category has been heavily criticized.

See also

1994 in film
67th Academy Awards
48th British Academy Film Awards
52nd Golden Globe Awards
1st Screen Actors Guild Awards

References

Golden Raspberry Awards
Golden Raspberry Awards ceremonies
Golden Raspberry Awards
Golden Raspberry Awards
Golden Raspberry Awards
Golden Raspberry